Christopher Myers (born 1 April 1969) is an English former professional footballer who played for clubs including Torquay United and Exeter City.

Career
Myers began his career with Torquay United, making his debut in 1986 whilst still a trainee. He turned professional in June 1987, but was released after just nine league games. He played for Dawlish Town and then Barnstaple Town until August 1990, but was re-signed by Torquay United. His second spell at the club was more successful, and he was a member of Torquay's promotion winning side in 1991.

He was sold to Dundee United for a fee of £100,000 in August 1993, but struggled to establish himself at Tannadice and returned to Torquay on loan in December 1993. On leaving Dundee United in January 1996, Myers joined Wrexham, but left to join Scarborough later that month without appearing for Wrexham. In March 1996, Myers returned to the South-West of England, joining Exeter City. Myers was released by Exeter in May 1997 and, after an unsuccessful trial with Torquay United, returned to playing non-league football with Dorchester Town under manager Stuart Morgan who had given him his debut for Torquay eleven years earlier.

He signed for Taunton Town in July 1998 and helped Taunton to the Western League title in 2000. He missed most of the following season through injury, but returned to play for Taunton until October 2003 when he left by mutual consent after discovering he required a knee operation. Two weeks later he took over as player-manager of Dawlish Town where he remained until June 2008 when resigned in order to spend more time with his Southport-based family. The previous season had seen him lead Dawlish to 2nd place in the Western League, their highest ever league finishing position.

In April 2009, Myers was appointed manager of Burscough on a temporary basis, although his first game in charge saw his side's relegation confirmed.

Personal life 
Myers' father, Cliff was a professional footballer and in 2014, Myers' son Spencer signed a scholarship deal with Premier League side Everton. At one point outside of football, Myers ran a golf shop with former Torquay United teammate Ken Veysey. He has also worked as a firefighter for the Lancashire Fire and Rescue Service.

References

External links
 

1969 births
Living people
People from Yeovil
English footballers
Torquay United F.C. players
Dundee United F.C. players
Wrexham A.F.C. players
Scarborough F.C. players
Exeter City F.C. players
Dorchester Town F.C. players
Taunton Town F.C. players
English football managers
Dawlish United F.C. players
Barnstaple Town F.C. players
English Football League players
Scottish Football League players
Association football midfielders